Adil Gowani (born  June 2, 1994) is a Mexican-Pakistani footballer who plays as a defender for Inter de Querétaro in Liga Premier de México.

References

Pakistani footballers
1994 births
Living people
Association football defenders